Eamonn Casey (24 April 1927 – 13 March 2017) was an Irish Catholic prelate who served as bishop of Galway and Kilmacduagh in Ireland from 1976 to 1992. His resignation in 1992, after it was revealed he had had an affair with an American woman, Annie Murphy, was a pivotal moment in Ireland's relationship with the Catholic church.

Subsequently, a number of women made allegations against Casey that they were sexually abused by him, two of whom received compensation following a High Court trial. One of the women, his niece Patricia Donovan, alleged in 2019 that she was repeatedly raped by Casey when she was five years old and assaulted sexually by him for more than a decade.
The Irish Times newspaper described Casey as "a sexist hypocrite", The Herald reports that he "liked fast cars... and was banned for drink driving", and numerous outlets reported  on his fraudulent use of church funds amounting to hundreds of thousands of pounds.

Priest and bishop
Casey was born on 24 April 1927 in County Kerry. He was educated in Limerick and in St Patrick's College, Maynooth. Casey was ordained a priest for the Diocese of Limerick on 17 June 1951 and appointed Bishop of Kerry on 17 July 1969.

He held this position until 1976, when he was appointed Bishop of Galway and Kilmacduagh and apostolic administrator of Kilfenora. While in Galway, Casey was seen as a progressive. It was a significant change in a diocese that had been led for nearly forty years by the very conservative Michael Browne (Bishop from 1937 to 1976).

Casey was highly influential in the Irish Catholic hierarchy, and served as bishop until his resignation in 1992. He was a friend and colleague of another highly prominent Irish priest, Father Michael Cleary.

Views

Irish emigrants
Casey worked aiding Irish emigrants in Britain. In addition, he supported the Dunnes Stores' staff who were locked out from 1982 to 1986 for refusing to sell goods from apartheid South Africa.

US foreign policy
Casey attended the funeral of the murdered Archbishop of San Salvador, Monsignor Óscar Romero. He witnessed first hand the massacre of those attending the funeral by government forces. He then became a vocal opponent of United States foreign policy in Central America, and, as a result, opposed the 1984 visit of United States President Ronald Reagan to Ireland, refusing to meet him when he came to Galway.

Sexual and financial scandal, and forced resignation 
In 1992 it was reported that, despite the vow of chastity undertaken by Catholic clergy, Casey had had a sexual relationship in the early 1970s with American woman Annie Murphy. When Murphy became pregnant, Casey was determined that the child should be given up for adoption in order to avoid any scandal for himself or the Catholic church. By contrast, Murphy was determined to accept responsibility for her child, and she returned to the United States with their son, Peter, who was born in 1974 in Dublin. Casey made covert payments for the boy's maintenance; these payments were fraudulently made from diocesan funds and channeled through intermediaries. In order to continue the cover up of his affair with Murphy and his fraudulent activities, Casey refused to develop a relationship with his son, or acknowledge him. Murphy was very disappointed by this, and in the early 1990s contacted The Irish Times to tell the truth about Casey's hypocrisy and deception. Having been exposed, Casey reluctantly admitted that he had "sinned" and wronged the boy, his mother and "God, his church and the clergy and people of the dioceses of Galway and Kerry", and his embezzlement of church funds. He was forced to resign as bishop, and fled the country under a cloud of scandal. Murphy published a book, Forbidden Fruit, in 1993 revealing the truth of their relationship and the son she bore by Casey, exposing the institutional level of hypocrisy, moral corruption and misogyny within the Irish Catholic Church.

At a conference for Cherish (an Irish Catholic charity established to support unmarried mothers), Casey said "“It is difficult to understand how the total rejection of their child . . . could be reconciled with Christian love and forgiveness.". Yet of his own son, he told Murphy "He is not my son. He’s entirely yours now."

Casey was ordered by the Vatican to leave Ireland, and became a missionary alongside members of the Missionary Society of St. James in a rural parish in Ecuador, whose language, Spanish, he did not speak. During this time, he travelled long distances to reach the widely scattered members of his parish, but did not travel to meet his own son. After his missionary position was completed, Casey took a position in the parish of St. Pauls, Haywards Heath, in south-east England.

In 2005, Casey was investigated in conjunction with the sexual abuse scandal in Galway, Kilmacduagh and Kilfenora diocese, and cleared of any wrongdoing. In 2019, it emerged that Casey had faced at least three accusations of sexual abuse before his death, with two High Court cases being settled. The Kerry diocese confirmed that it had received allegations against him, that Gardaí and health authorities had been informed and that the person concerned was offered support by the diocese.

Casey was succeeded by his secretary, James McLoughlin, who served in the post until his own retirement on 3 July 2005.

He returned to Ireland in 2006 with his reputation in tatters, and was not permitted to say Mass in public.

He is the subject of Martin Egan's song "Casey", sung by Christy Moore. He is also the subject of the Saw Doctors' song "Howya Julia".

Illness and death
In August 2011, Casey, in poor health, was admitted to a nursing home in County Clare. He died on 13 March 2017 at the age of 89, a month before his 90th birthday. He is interred in Galway cathedral's crypt.

References

1927 births
2017 deaths
20th-century Roman Catholic bishops in Ireland
Clergy from County Kerry
Christian clergy from County Galway
Roman Catholic bishops of Kerry
Roman Catholic bishops of Galway, Kilmacduagh and Kilfenora
Catholic Church sexual abuse scandals in Ireland